Herbert William Bryant (30 June 1867 – 23 February 1910) was an English first-class cricketer active 1888–89 who played for Middlesex as a wicketkeeper. He was born in Uxbridge; died in the Azores of sudden heart failure after suffering acute gastritis.

References

1867 births
1910 deaths
English cricketers
Middlesex cricketers